Rímac was a steamer involved in decisive actions of the War of the Pacific (1879–1884) and Thousand Days' War (1899–1902).

After construction of the ship in the United Kingdom in 1872, she was purchased by the Compañía Sudamericana de Vapores and arrived in Chile in 1874.

On 5 May 1874 the Chilean government issued a subvention program under which Chilean enterprises supplied Navy with materiel, called "Convenio de subvención." At the beginning of the war and under this agreement Rímac was handed over to the Chilean Navy, together with the ships Loa and Itata.

In May 1879 she towed Covadonga to Antofagasta after the Battle of Punta Gruesa.

In June 1879 the Peruvian ironclad  captured Rímac with 260 men of a cavalry regiment, weapons and ammunition. This loss caused riots in Santiago and led to the resignation of the Minister of National Defense, Basilio Urrutia Vásquez, and the commander-in-chief of the Chilean Navy, Juan Williams Rebolledo.

After the defeat of the Peruvian Army in the battles of San Juan and Miraflores, the Secretary of the Navy, Captain Manuel Villar, during the night of 16 January 1881 ordered the destruction of the port defenses and the remaining ships of the Peruvian Navy, including Rímac, to prevent their (re-)capture by the Chilean troops. The order was executed by the captains Luis Germán Astete and Manuel Villavicencio during the dawn of 17 January 1881. But few months later, in June 1881 she was refloated and auctioned off to CSAV (again) for $36,000.

During the Thousand Days' War in Colombia, Rímac, then renamed Lautaro, was lent to the Conservative Party; she was sunk off Panama City on 20 January 1902, fighting against Admiral Padilla of the Liberal Party.

See also
 List of decommissioned ships of the Chilean Navy

References

Auxiliary ships of the Chilean Navy
Auxiliary ships of the Peruvian Navy
Ships of the War of the Pacific
Shipwrecks of the War of the Pacific
Scuttled vessels of Peru
Maritime incidents in January 1881
Maritime incidents in 1902
1872 ships
Ships built on the River Mersey
Shipwrecks in the Gulf of Panama